The Danube is the second-longest river in Europe, after the Volga in Russia. It flows through much of Central and Southeastern Europe, from the Black Forest into the Black Sea. A large and historically important river, it was once a frontier of the Roman Empire and today connects ten European countries, running through their territories or being a border. Among the many cities on the river are four national capitals: Vienna, Budapest, Belgrade and Bratislava. Its drainage basin amounts to 817 000 km² and extends into nine more countries. 

The Danube's longest headstream Breg rises in Furtwangen im Schwarzwald, while the river carries its name from its source confluence in Donaueschingen onwards. Since ancient times, the Danube has been a traditional trade route in Europe. Today,  of its total length are navigable. The Danube is linked to the North Sea via the Rhine–Main–Danube Canal, connecting the Danube at Kelheim with the Main at Bamberg. The river is also an important source of hydropower and drinking water. 

The Danube river basin is home to fish species such as pike, zander, huchen, Wels catfish, burbot and tench. It is also home to a large diversity of carp and sturgeon, as well as salmon and trout. A few species of euryhaline fish, such as European seabass, mullet, and eel, inhabit the Danube Delta and the lower portion of the river.

Names and etymology

Other names
Today the river carries its name from its source confluence in Donaueschingen onwards. Its longest headstream Breg rises in Furtwangen im Schwarzwald.
The river was known to the ancient Greeks as the  a borrowing from a Daco-Thracian name meaning 'strong, swift', from a root possibly also encountered in the ancient name of the Dniester ( in Latin,  in Greek) and akin to Iranic  'swift' and Sanskrit  'swift', from the PIE ,  'to flow'.

The Middle Mongolian name for the Danube was transliterated as Tho-na in 1829 by Jean-Pierre Abel-Rémusat.

The modern languages spoken in the Danube basin all use names related to :
;
 (via German);
; 
;
;
;
;
;
;
;
;
;
;
;
;
;
;;
;
;
, .

Etymology
Danube is an Old European river name derived from the Celtic 'danu' or 'don' (both Celtic gods), which itself derived from the Proto-Indo-European . Other European river names from the same root include the Dunaj, Dzvina/Daugava, Don, Donets, Dnieper, Dniestr, Dysna and Tana/Deatnu. In Rigvedic Sanskrit, dānu (दनु) means "fluid, dewdrop" and dānuja (दनु-ज) means "born from dānu" or "born from dew-drops". In Avestan, the same word means "river". Its Sámi name  means "Great River". It is possible that  in Scythian as in Avestan was a generic word for "river": Dnieper and Dniestr, from Danapris and Danastius, are presumed to continue Scythian  "far river" and  "near river", respectively.

The Latin name is masculine, as are all its Slavic names, except Slovene (the name of the Rhine is also masculine in Latin, most of the Slavic languages, as well as in German).

Romanian differs from other surrounding languages in designating the river with a feminine term, . This form was not inherited from Latin, although Romanian is a Romance language. To explain the loss of the Latin name, scholars who suppose that Romanian developed near the large river propose that the Romanian name descends from a hypothetical Thracian . The Proto-Indo-European root of this presumed name is related to the Iranic word ""/"", while the supposed suffix  is encountered in the ancient name of the Ialomița River, Naparis, and in the unidentified Miliare river mentioned by Jordanes in his Getica. Gábor Vékony says that this hypothesis is not plausible, because the Greeks borrowed the Istros form from the native Thracians. He proposes that the Romanian name is a loanword from a Turkic language (Cuman or Pecheneg).

Geography

Classified as an international waterway, it originates in the town of Donaueschingen, in the Black Forest of Germany, at the confluence of the rivers Brigach and Breg.

Once a long-standing frontier of the Roman Empire, the river passes through or touches the borders of 10 countries: Romania (29.0% of basin area), Hungary (11.6%), Serbia (10.2%), Austria (10.0%), Germany (7.0%), Bulgaria (5.9%), Slovakia (5.9%), Croatia (4.4%), Ukraine (3.8%), and Moldova (1.6%). Its drainage basin extends into nine more (ten if Kosovo is included).

Drainage basin
In addition to the bordering countries (see above), the drainage basin includes parts of nine more countries: Bosnia and Herzegovina (4.6% of the basin area), the Czech Republic (2.9%), Slovenia (2.0%), Montenegro (0.9%), Switzerland (0.2%), Italy (<0.15%), Poland (<0.1%), North Macedonia (<0.1%) and Albania (<0.1%). The Danube River Basin is divided into three main parts, separated by "gates" where the river is forced to cut through mountainous sections:
 Upper Basin, from the headwaters to the Devín Gate. 
 Middle Basin, usually called the Pannonian basin or Carpathian Basin, between the Devín Gate and the Iron Gates. It includes the Hungarian plains Kisalföld and Alföld.
 Lower Basin, from the Iron Gates to the river mouth, including the Danube Delta.

Discharge

Mean annual discharge on the hydrological stations (period from 2000 to 2020); 1 - Reni, Isaccea; 2 - Silistra; 3 - Pristol; 4 - Batina, Bezdan; 5 - Nagymaros, Szob; 6 - Bratislava, Wolfsthal; 7 - Untergriesbach

Multiannual average, minimum and maximum discharge (water period from 1876 to 2010)

Simulated water and suspended sediment results from climate-driven decadal study (with STD through specific decade)

Tributaries

The land drained by the Danube extends into many other countries. Many Danubian tributaries are important rivers in their own right, navigable by barges and other shallow-draught boats. From its source to its outlet into the Black Sea, its main tributaries are (as they enter):

Cities and towns

The Danube flows through many cities, including four national capitals (shown below in bold), more than any other river in the world. Ordered from the source to the mouth they are:
Germany
Donaueschingen in the State of Baden-Württemberg – rivers Brigach and Breg join to form the Danube
Möhringen an der Donau in Baden-Württemberg
Tuttlingen in Baden-Württemberg
Sigmaringen in Baden-Württemberg
Riedlingen in Baden-Württemberg
Munderkingen in Baden-Württemberg
Ehingen in Baden-Württemberg
Ulm in Baden-Württemberg
Neu-Ulm in Bavaria
Günzburg in Bavaria
Dillingen an der Donau in Bavaria
Donauwörth in Bavaria
Neuburg an der Donau in Bavaria
Ingolstadt in Bavaria
Kelheim in Bavaria
Regensburg in Bavaria
Straubing in Bavaria
Deggendorf in Bavaria
Passau in Bavaria

Austria
Linz, capital of Upper Austria
Krems in Lower Austria
Tulln in Lower Austria
Vienna – capital of Austria and the most populous city on the Danube, where the Danube floodplain is called the Lobau, though the Innere Stadt is situated away from the main flow of the Danube (it is bounded by the Donaukanal – 'Danube canal').

Slovakia
Bratislava – capital of Slovakia
Komárno
Štúrovo

Hungary
Mosonmagyaróvár
Győr
Komárom
Esztergom
Visegrád – This section of the river is also called Danube Bend.
Vác
Szentendre
Göd
Dunakeszi
Budapest – capital of Hungary, the largest city and the largest agglomeration on Danube (about 3,300,000 people).
Szigetszentmiklós
Százhalombatta
Ráckeve
Adony
Dunaújváros
Dunaföldvár
Paks
Kalocsa
Baja
Mohács
Croatia
Vukovar
Ilok

Serbia
Apatin
Bačka Palanka
Čerević
Futog
Veternik
Novi Sad – regional capital of Vojvodina
Sremski Karlovci
Zemun
Belgrade – capital of Serbia
Pančevo
Smederevo
Kovin
Veliko Gradište
Golubac
Donji Milanovac
Kladovo
 
Bulgaria
Vidin
Lom
Kozloduy
Oryahovo
Nikopol
Belene
Svishtov
Ruse
Tutrakan
Silistra

Romania
Moldova Nouă
Orșova
Drobeta-Turnu Severin
Calafat
Bechet
Dăbuleni
Corabia
Turnu Măgurele
Zimnicea
Giurgiu
Oltenița
Călărași
Fetești
Cernavodă
Hârșova
Brăila – limit of the maritime sector of the Danube
Galați – largest port on the Danube
Isaccea
Tulcea
Sulina – last city through which it flows
Moldova
Giurgiulești
Ukraine
Reni
Izmail
Kiliia
Vylkove

Islands

Ada Kaleh Island
Ostrovul Mare, Gogoșu
Balta Ialomiței
Belene Island
Csepel Island
Donauinsel
Great Brăila Island
Great War Island
Island of Mohács
Kozloduy Island
Margaret Island
Ostrovo (Kostolac)
Ostrovul Ciocănești
Ostrovul Mare, Islaz
Ribarsko Ostrvo, Novi Sad
Island of Šarengrad
Szigetköz
Island of Szentendre
Vardim Island
Island of Vukovar
Žitný ostrov

Sectioning
Upper Section: From spring to Devín Gate, at the border of Austria and Slovakia. Danube remains a characteristic mountain river until Passau, with average bottom gradient 0.0012% (12 ppm), from Passau to Devín Gate the gradient lessens to 0.0006% (6 ppm).
Middle Section: From Devín Gate to Iron Gate, at the border of Serbia and Romania. The riverbed widens and the average bottom gradient becomes only 0.00006% (0.6 ppm).
Lower Section: From Iron Gate to Sulina, with average gradient as little as 0.00003% (0.3 ppm).

Modern navigation

The Danube is navigable by ocean ships from the Black Sea to Brăila in Romania (the maritime river sector), and further on by river ships to Kelheim, Bavaria, Germany; smaller craft can navigate further upstream to Ulm, Württemberg, Germany. About 60 of its tributaries are also navigable.

In 1994 the Danube was declared one of ten Pan-European transport corridors, routes in Central and Eastern Europe that required major investment over the following ten to fifteen years. The amount of goods transported on the Danube increased to about 100 million tons in 1987. 
In 1999, transport on the river was made difficult by the NATO bombing of three bridges in Serbia during the Kosovo War. Clearance of the resulting debris was completed in 2002, and a temporary pontoon bridge that hampered navigation was removed in 2005.

On 13 April 2006, a record peak discharge at Iron Gate Dam reached .

A Danube-Aegean canal has been proposed.

Piracy
In 2010–12, shipping companies, especially from Ukraine, claimed that their vessels suffered from "regular pirate attacks" on the Serbian and the Romanian stretches of the Danube. However, the transgressions may not be considered acts of piracy, as defined according to the United Nations Convention on the Law of the Sea, but rather instances of "river robbery".

On the other hand, media reports say the crews on transport ships often steal and sell their own cargo and then blame the plundering on "pirates", and the alleged attacks are not piracy but small-time contraband theft along the river.

Danube Delta

The Danube Delta is the largest river delta in the European Union. The greater part of the Danube Delta lies in Romania (Tulcea county), while its northern part, on the left bank of the Chilia arm, is situated in Ukraine (Odesa Oblast). If one includes the lagoons of Razim-Sinoe ( of which  water surface), which are located south of the delta proper, but are related to it geologically and ecologically (their combined territory is part of the World Heritage Site), the total area of the Danube Delta reaches .

The Danube Delta is also the best-preserved river delta in Europe, a UNESCO World Heritage Site (since 1991) and a Ramsar Site. Its lakes and marshes support 45 freshwater fish species. Its wetlands support vast flocks of migratory birds of over 300 species, including the endangered pygmy cormorant (Phalacrocorax pygmaeus). These are threatened by rival canalization and drainage schemes such as the Bystroye Canal.

2022 heat wave
In 2022, there was a major heat wave in Europe. As a result, there was less water flowing in the rivers. As the water level decreased, a number of ship wrecks from World War II emerged in the Danube River. Many of the ships were from Nazi Germany's Black Sea Fleet and had been scuttled to stop them from falling into enemy hands.

International cooperation

Ecology and environment

The International Commission for the Protection of the Danube River (ICPDR) is an organization that consists of 14 member states (Germany, Austria, the Czech Republic, Slovakia, Slovenia, Hungary, Croatia, Bosnia and Herzegovina, Serbia, Bulgaria, Romania, Moldova, Montenegro, and Ukraine) and the European Union. The commission, established in 1998, deals with the whole Danube river basin, which includes tributaries and groundwater resources. Its goal is to implement the Danube River Protection Convention by promoting and coordinating sustainable and equitable water management, including conservation, improvement, and rational use of waters and the implementation of the EU Water Framework Directive and the Danube Strategy.

Navigation

The Danube Commission is concerned with the maintenance and improvement of the river's navigation conditions. It was established in 1948 by seven countries bordering the river. Members include representatives from Austria, Bulgaria, Croatia, Germany, Hungary, Moldova, Slovakia, Romania, Russia, Ukraine, and Serbia; it meets regularly twice a year. It also convenes groups of experts to consider items provided for in the commission's working plans.

The commission dates to the Paris Conferences of 1856 and 1921, which established for the first time an international regime to safeguard free navigation on the Danube. Today the Commission include riparian and non-riparian states.

Geology

Although the headwaters of the Danube are relatively small today, geologically, the Danube is much older than the Rhine, with which its catchment area competes in today's southern Germany. This has a few interesting geological complications. Since the Rhine is the only river rising in the Alps mountains which flows north towards the North Sea, an invisible line beginning at Piz Lunghin divides large parts of southern Germany, which is sometimes referred to as the European Watershed.

Before the last ice age in the Pleistocene, the Rhine started at the southwestern tip of the Black Forest, while the waters from the Alps that today feed the Rhine were carried east by the so-called Urdonau (original Danube). Parts of this ancient river's bed, which was much larger than today's Danube, can still be seen in (now waterless) canyons in today's landscape of the Swabian Alb. After the Upper Rhine valley had been eroded, most waters from the Alps changed their direction and began feeding the Rhine. Today's upper Danube is but a meek reflection of the ancient one.

Since the Swabian Alb is largely shaped of porous limestone, and since the Rhine's level is much lower than the Danube's, today subsurface rivers carry much water from the Danube to the Rhine. On many days in the summer, when the Danube carries little water, it completely oozes away noisily into these underground channels at two locations in the Swabian Alb, which are referred to as the Donauversickerung (Danube Sink). The European Water Divide applies only for those waters that pass beyond this point, and only during the days of the year when the Danube carries enough water to survive the sinkholes in the Donauversickerung.

Since such large volumes of underground water erode much of the surrounding limestone, it is estimated that the Danube upper course will one day disappear entirely in favor of the Rhine, an event called stream capturing.

The hydrological parameters of Danube are regularly monitored in Croatia at Batina, Dalj, Vukovar and Ilok.

History

The Danube basin was the site of some of the earliest human cultures. The Danubian Neolithic cultures include the Linear Pottery cultures of the mid-Danube basin. Many sites of the sixth-to-third millennium BCE Vinča culture, (Vinča, Serbia) are sited along the Danube. The third millennium BCE Vučedol culture (from the Vučedol site near Vukovar, Croatia) is famous for its ceramics.

Darius the Great, king of Persia, crossed the river in the late 6th century BCE to invade European Scythia and to subdue the Scythians.

Alexander the Great defeated the Triballian king Syrmus and the northern barbarian Thracian and Illyrian tribes by advancing from Macedonia as far as the Danube in 336 BCE.

Under the Romans, the Danube formed the border of the Empire with the tribes to the north almost from its source to its mouth. At the same time, it was a route for the transport of troops and the supply of settlements downstream. From 37 CE to the reign of the Emperor Valentinian I (364–375) the Danubian Limes was the northeastern border of the Empire, with occasional interruptions such as the fall of the Danubian Limes in 259. The crossing of the Danube into Dacia was achieved by the Imperium Romanum, first in two battles in 102 and then in 106 after the construction of a bridge in 101 near the garrison town of Drobeta at the Iron Gate. This victory over Dacia under Decebalus enabled the Province of Dacia to be created, but in 271 it was abandoned by emperor Aurelian.

Avars used the river as their southeastern border in the 6th century.

Ancient cultural perspectives of the lower Danube
Part of the rivers Danubius or Istros was also known as (together with the Black Sea) the Okeanos in ancient times, being called the Okeanos Potamos (Okeanos River). The lower Danube was also called the Keras Okeanoio (Gulf or Horn of Okeanos) in the Argonautica by Apollonius Rhodos (Argon. IV. 282). 

At the end of the Okeanos Potamos, is the holy island of Alba (Leuke, Pytho Nisi, Isle of Snakes), sacred to the Pelasgian (and later, Greek) Apollo, greeting the sun rising in the east. Hecateus Abderitas refers to Apollo's island from the region of the Hyperboreans, in the Okeanos. It was on Leuke, in one version of his legend, that the hero Achilles was buried (to this day, one of the mouths of the Danube is called Chilia). Old Romanian folk songs recount a white monastery on a white island with nine priests.

Rivalry along the Danube

Between the late 14th and late 19th centuries, the Ottoman Empire competed first with the Kingdom of Serbia, Second Bulgarian Empire, Kingdom of Hungary, Principality of Wallachia, Principality of Moldavia and later with the Austrian Habsburgs, Polish–Lithuanian Commonwealth, and Russian Empire for controlling the Danube (Tuna in Turkish), which became the northern border of the Ottoman Empire for centuries. Many of the Ottoman–Hungarian Wars (1366–1526) and Ottoman–Habsburg wars (1526–1791) were fought along the river.

The most important wars of the Ottoman Empire along the Danube include the Battle of Nicopolis (1396), the Siege of Belgrade (1456), the Battle of Mohács (1526), the first Turkish Siege of Vienna (1529), the Siege of Esztergom (1543), the Long War (1591–1606), the Battle of Vienna (1683), the Great Turkish War (1683–1699), the Crimean War (1853–1856) and the Russo-Turkish War (1877–1878).

Second World War
During the 2011 renovation of the Margaret Bridge, Budapest, human remains were discovered. The mostly Jewish remains were victims of the far-right Arrow Cross Party, who briefly governed Hungary from 1944.

Economics

Drinking water
Along its course, the Danube is a source of drinking water for about 20 million people. In Baden-Württemberg, Germany, almost 30 percent (as of 2004) of the water for the area between Stuttgart, Bad Mergentheim, Aalen and Alb-Donau (district) comes from purified water of the Danube. Other cities such as Ulm and Passau also use some water from the Danube.

In Austria and Hungary, most water is drawn from ground and spring sources, and only in rare cases is water from the Danube used. Most states also find it too difficult to clean the water because of extensive pollution; only parts of Romania where the water is cleaner still obtain drinking water from the Danube on a regular basis.

Navigation and transport

In the 19th century, the Danube was an important waterway but was, as The Times of London put it, "annually swept by ice that will lift a large ship out of the water or cut her in two as if she were a carrot."

Today, as "Corridor VII" of the European Union, the Danube is an important transport route. Since the opening of the Rhine–Main–Danube Canal, the river connects the Port of Rotterdam and the industrial centers of Western Europe with the Black Sea and, also, through the Danube – Black Sea Canal, with the Port of Constanța.

The waterway is designed for large-scale inland vessels but it can carry much larger vessels on most of its course. The Danube has been partly canalized in Germany (5 locks) and Austria (10 locks). Proposals to build a number of new locks to improve navigation have not progressed, due in part to environmental concerns.

Downstream from the Freudenau locks in Vienna, canalization of the Danube was limited to the Gabčíkovo dam and locks near Bratislava and the two double Iron Gate locks in the border stretch of the Danube between Serbia and Romania. These locks have larger dimensions.

The Danube connects with the Rhine–Main–Danube Canal at Kelheim, with the Donaukanal in Vienna, and with the Danube–Black Sea Canal at Cernavodă.

Apart from a couple of secondary navigable branches, the only major navigable rivers linked to the Danube are the Drava, Sava and Tisa. In Serbia, a canal network also connects to the river; the network, known as the Danube–Tisa–Danube Canals, links sections downstream.

In the Austrian and German sections of the Danube, a type of flat-bottomed boat called a Zille was developed for use along the river. Zillen are still used today for fishing, ferrying, and other transport of goods and people in this area.

Fishing
The importance of fishing on the Danube, which was critical in the Middle Ages, has declined dramatically. Some fishermen are still active at certain points on the river, and the Danube Delta still has an important industry. However, some of the river's resources have been managed in an environmentally unsustainable manner in the past, leading to damage by pollution, alterations to the channel, and major infrastructure development, including large hydropower dams.

The sturgeon stocks associated with the Danube River basin have, over the centuries, formed the basis of a large and significant commercial fishery, renowned throughout the world. The construction of the dams, besides overfishing and river pollution, has a significant role in sturgeon population decline because it creates a barrier for fish migratory species that usually spawn in the upper parts of the river. The spawning areas of migratory fishes species has been dramatically reduced by the construction of hydropower and navigation systems at Iron Gates I (1974) and Iron Gates II (1984) The initial design of these dams has not included any fish passage facility. The possibility of building a man-made fish pass enabling migration for fish species including the sturgeon, is currently under review by projects such as We Pass.

The Upper Danube ecoregion alone has about 60 fish species and the Lower Danube–Dniester ecoregion has about twice as many. Among these are an exceptionally high diversity of sturgeon, a total of six species (beluga, Russian sturgeon, bastard sturgeon, sterlet, starry sturgeon and European sea sturgeon), but these are all threatened and have largely–or entirely in the case of the European sea sturgeon–disappeared from the river. The huchen, one of the largest species of salmon, is endemic to the Danube basin, but has been introduced elsewhere by humans.

Tourism

Important tourist and natural spots along the Danube include the Wachau Valley, the Nationalpark Donau-Auen in Austria, Gemenc in Hungary, the Naturpark Obere Donau in Germany, Kopački rit in Croatia, Iron Gate in Serbia and Romania, the Danube Delta in Romania, and the Srebarna Nature Reserve in Bulgaria.

Also, leisure and travel cruises on the river are of significance. Besides the often frequented route between Vienna and Budapest, some ships even go from Passau in Germany to the Danube Delta and back. During the peak season, more than 70 cruise liners are in use on the river, while the traffic-free upper parts can only be discovered with canoes or boats.

The Danube region is not only culturally and historically of importance, but also due to its fascinating landmarks and sights important for the regional tourism industry. With its well established infrastructure regarding cycling, hiking, and travel possibilities, the region along the Danube attracts every year an international clientele. In Austria alone, there are more than 14 million overnight stays and about 6.5 million arrivals per year.

The Danube Banks in Budapest are a part of Unesco World Heritage sites, they can be viewed from a number of sightseeing cruises offered in the city.

The Danube Bend is also a popular tourist destination.

Danube Bike Trail

The Danube Bike Trail (also called Danube Cycle Path or the Donauradweg) is a bicycle trail along the river. Especially the parts through Germany and Austria are very popular, which makes it one of the 10 most popular bike trails in Germany.

The Danube Bike Trail starts at the origin of the Danube and ends where the river flows into the Black Sea. It is divided into four sections:
Donaueschingen–Passau
Passau–Vienna
Vienna–Budapest
Budapest–Black Sea

Sultans Trail
The Sultans Trail is a hiking trail that runs along the river between Vienna and Smederevo in Serbia. From there the Sultans Trail leaves the Danube, terminating in Istanbul. Sections along the river are as follows.
Vienna–Budapest
Budapest–Smederevo

Donausteig

In 2010, the Donausteig, a hiking trail from Passau to Grein, was opened. The route passes through five Bavarian and 40 Austrian communities. An impressive landscape and beautiful viewpoints, which are along the river, are the highlights of the Donausteig.

The Route of Emperors and Kings
The Route of Emperors and Kings is an international touristic route leading from Regensburg to Budapest, calling in Passau, Linz and Vienna. The international consortium ARGE Die Donau-Straße der Kaiser und Könige, comprising ten tourism organisations, shipping companies, and cities, strives for the conservation and touristic development of the Danube region.

In medieval Regensburg, with its maintained old town, stone bridge and cathedral, the Route of Emperors and Kings begins. It continues to Engelhartszell, with the only Trappist monastery in Austria. Further highlight-stops along the Danube, include the "Schlögener Schlinge", the city of Linz, which was European Capital of Culture in 2009 with its contemporary art richness, the Melk Abbey, the university city of Krems and the cosmopolitan city of Vienna. Before the Route of Emperors and Kings ends, you pass Bratislava and Budapest, the latter of which was seen as the twin town of Vienna during the times of the Austro-Hungarian Empire.
Since ancient Roman times, famous emperors and their retinue traveled on and along the Danube and used the river for travel and transportation. While traveling on the mainland was quite exhausting, most people preferred to travel by ship on the Danube. So the Route of Emperors and Kings was the setting for many important historical events, which characterize the Danube up until today.

The route got its name from the Holy Roman Emperor Frederick I of Barbarossa and the crusaders as well as from Richard I of England who had been jailed in the Dürnstein Castle, which is situated above the Danube. The most imperial journeys throughout time were those of the Habsburg family. Once crowned in Frankfurt, the emperors ruled from Vienna and also held in Regensburg the Perpetual Diet of Regensburg. Many famous castles, palaces, residences, and state-run convents were built by the Habsburger along the river. Nowadays they still remind us of the bold architecture of the "Donaubarock".

Today, people can not only travel by boat on the Danube but also by train, by bike on the Danube Bike Trail or walk on the "Donausteig" and visit the UNESCO World Heritage cities of Regensburg, Wachau and Vienna.

Important national parks
 Naturpark Obere Donau (Germany)
 Donauauen zwischen Neuburg und Ingolstadt (Germany) – map
 Nature protection area Donauleiten (Germany)
 Nationalpark Donau Auen (Austria) – map
 Chránená krajinná oblasť Dunajské luhy (Slovakia) – map
 Danube-Ipoly National Park (Hungary) – map
 Danube-Drava National Park (Hungary) – map
 Naturalpark Kopački Rit (Croatia) – map
 Gornje Podunavlje Nature Reserve (Serbia) – map
 Fruška Gora National Park (Serbia)
 Koviljsko-petrovaradinski rit Nature Reserve (Serbia)
 Great War Island Nature Reserve (Serbia)
 Đerdap National park (Serbia)
 Iron Gates Natural Park (Romania)
 Persina Nature Park (Bulgaria) – map
 Kalimok-Brushlen Protected Site (Bulgaria) – map
 Srebarna Nature Reserve (Bulgaria) – map
 Măcin Mountains Natural Park (Romania)
 Balta Mică a Brăilei Natural Park (Romania)
 Danube Delta Biosphere Reserve (Romania) – map
 Danube Biosphere Reserve in Ukraine

In popular culture

 The Danube is mentioned in the title of a famous waltz by Austrian composer Johann Strauss, The Blue Danube Waltz (On the Beautiful Blue Danube). This piece is well known across the world and is also used widely as a lullaby. The Waves of the Danube is a waltz by the Romanian composer Iosif Ivanovici (1845–1902); as the Anniversary Song, it has been performed by many vocalists, such as Al Jolson, Rosemary Clooney, Vera Lynn, Tom Jones, and countless others. [It is most commonly known as the Anniversary Waltz, though that is actually a different song and melody.] Joe Zawinul wrote a symphony about the Danube called Stories of the Danube. It was performed for the first time at the 1993 Bruckner festival, at Linz.
 The Danube figures prominently in the Bulgarian National Anthem, as a symbolic representation of the country's natural beauty. In Lithuanian folklore songs, the appearance of Danube (Dunojus, Dunojėlis) is more common than the appearance of the longest Lithuanian river Neman.
 The German tradition of landscape painting, the Danube school, was developed in the Danube valley in the 16th century.
 One of Claudio Magris's masterpieces is called Danube. The book, published in 1986, is a large cultural-historical essay, in which Magris travels the Danube from the first sources to the delta, tracing the rich European ethnic and cultural heritage, literary and ideological past and present along the way.
 Jules Verne's The Danube Pilot (1908) (Le Pilote du Danube) depicts the adventures of fisherman Serge Ladko as he travels down the river.
 In the Star Trek universe, the Danube-class runabout is a type of starship used by the Federation Starfleet, most notably in the Deep Space Nine series.
 Miklós Jancsó's film the Blue Danube Waltz (1992)
Algernon Blackwood's short story "The Willows" mostly takes place on the river.

See also

 Danube Monarchy
 Danubian Principalities
 List of cities and towns on Danube river
 2006 European floods
 Between the Woods and the Water, a travel book telling of a Danubian journey in 1934
 The Ister, 2004 film
 Executive Agency for Exploration and Maintenance of the Danube River
 List of crossings of the Danube
 Steamboats on the Danube
Black Sea drainage basin

References

External links

 
 Danube watershed map and information from the World Resources Institute
 Danube Panorama Project
 сайт о Дунае 
 Danube and the sport of rowing
 Danube image pool on Flickr
 Danube Tourist Commission  
 danubemap.eu – The Tourist Map of the Danube (archive)
 International Commission for the Protection of the Danube River
 Bridges of Budapest over the Danube river
 Description of the Danube estuary in June 1877, The Times of London
Old maps of the Danube, Eran Laor Cartographic Collection, The National Library of Israel

 

International rivers of Europe
Geography of Bács-Kiskun County
Geography of Central Europe
Geography of Eastern Europe
Geography of Southeastern Europe
Geography of Vojvodina
Rivers of Austria
Rivers of Bavaria
Rivers of Bulgaria
Rivers of Croatia
Rivers of Germany
Rivers of Hungary
Rivers of Moldova
Rivers of Romania
Rivers of Serbia
Rivers of Slovakia
Rivers of Ukraine
Rivers of Odesa Oblast
Rivers of Baden-Württemberg
Rivers of Upper Austria
Rivers of Lower Austria
Rivers of Vienna
Bačka
Banat
Syrmia
Border rivers
Bulgaria–Romania border
Croatia–Serbia border
Hungary–Slovakia border
Romania–Ukraine border
Romania–Serbia border
Federal waterways in Germany
Articles containing video clips